Alucita anticoma is a moth in the family Alucitidae. It is found in New Guinea.

This species belongs to a group of species with white forewings and has a wingspan of 17mm.

References

Moths described in 1929
Alucitidae
Moths of New Guinea